Jean-Martin Aussant is a Canadian economist, musician, and politician, now serving as Executive director of the Chantier de l'économie sociale. He represented Nicolet-Yamaska in the National Assembly of Quebec from 2008 to 2012, first as a member of the Parti Québécois and then as leader of his own party, Option nationale.  He was defeated when he ran for re-election in Nicolet-Bécancour in the 2012 general election. He later rejoined the Parti Québécois to run unsuccessfully in the 2018 Quebec election.

Early life and career

Aussant was born in Sorel, Quebec. He has a bachelor's degree in Business Administration from the Université Laval (1993) and a master's degree in Economic Analysis from the Université de Montréal (1995). He started Ph.D. work at the Universitat Autònoma de Barcelona in Spain, but left in 1997 to work as a consultant for Barra International, now a unit of MSCI.

Aussant was a research director and portfolio manager at Addenda Capital from 1999 to 2003 and a vice-president at Morgan Stanley Capital International/Barra in London, Britain from 2003 to 2005. Returning to Quebec in 2005, he was a manager for Canada's Public Sector Pension Investment Board for two years before starting a private consulting practice. He was also a founding director of the Montreal divisions of both the Global Association of Risk Professionals and the Professional Risk Managers' International Association.

Legislator

Parti Québécois member
Aussant was elected to the National Assembly of Quebec in the 2008 general election, defeating his Liberal opponent by only 141 votes. This was the second closest result in the province. The Liberals won a majority government across the province under Jean Charest's leadership, and the Parti Québécois formed the official opposition. Aussant was appointed as his party's critic for financial institutions and international commerce and became an opposition representative on the legislative committee on public finances.

He questioned the Charest government's appointment of Michael Sabia as head of the Caisse de dépôt et placement du Québec in May 2009, arguing that Sabia had tried to move BCE Inc.'s upper management and operations from Montreal to Toronto and could not be trusted to represent Quebec's interests. The following year, Aussant accused Sabia of having cost Quebecers $6 billion as the result of a poor risk management strategy.

When Quebec investment advisor Earl Jones was accused of stealing money from his clients in 2009, Aussant called for new legislation requiring financial advisors to register with the province's financial markets authority. He also called for the Charest government to create a parliamentary commission on economic crime.

In 2010, Aussant argued that Quebec could save about $840 million by removing the Canada Revenue Agency from tax collection in Quebec. He later criticized a proposed merger of the London Stock Exchange with the TMX Group, arguing that it would be "a further loss of ground for Quebec." (The TMX Group took over the Montreal Stock Exchange in 2008, through a deal which gave Quebec's Autorité des marchés financiers a say over future changes in the company.)

Aussant was a member of the PQ's hardline indépendantiste wing. Before leaving the party, he founded a video touring series with three other PQ MNAs to promote the benefits of an independent Quebec, called the ABCD (for Aussant, Blanchet, Cloutier, Drainville).

Independent
On June 7, 2011, Aussant followed caucus-mates Louise Beaudoin, Pierre Curzi, and Lisette Lapointe in resigning from the Parti Québécois caucus. Unlike the first three legislators who criticized PQ leader Pauline Marois for supporting a bill that endorsed a controversial agreement between Quebec City and Quebecor Inc. on the construction of a new arena, Aussant criticized Marois for downplaying Quebec sovereignty and called on her to resign as party leader.

Aussant sat in the legislature as an independent. During this period, he submitted various bills to the National Assembly, including Bill 596 -Act to modernize Quebec’s democratic institutions- covering topics such as the implementation of a proportional electoral system, fixed-date elections, the end of private funding for political parties and the possibility for electors to bring popular initiatives to the National Assembly if the support of at least 5% of the electors is gathered. He dismissed suggestions that he could join a new political movement led by former PQ minister François Legault, stating that he and Legault were on opposite sides of the sovereignty issue and describing Legault's movement as "populism of the worst kind."

Option nationale
Following his departure from the PQ, Aussant created his own political party, Option nationale, which officially became registered on October 31, 2011. The party proposed to be more committed to Quebec sovereignty than the Parti Québécois, and would seek an electoral mandate for full-fledged autonomy, before a referendum to adopt the constitution of Quebec as an sovereign nation-state. No Option Nationale candidates were elected in the ensuing election; Aussant lost his seat to a Coalition Avenir Québec candidate.

On June 19, 2013, Aussant left his role as leader of the party. He stated "family and personal matters" as the official reason. In August of the same year, he announced that he would be leaving Quebec to work once again with Morgan Stanley Capital International in Britain. He noted that he had not received job offers from Quebec employers and speculated that his involvement in the Quebec separatist movement may have been the reason.

Return to the Parti Québécois
Aussant rejoined the Parti Québécois, and ran as its candidate in the 2018 election in the riding of Pointe-aux-Trembles. However, he was defeated.

Electoral record

References

External links
 

Living people
1970 births
Parti Québécois MNAs
Université de Montréal alumni
Université Laval alumni
Independent MNAs in Quebec
People from Centre-du-Québec
Quebec political party leaders
Canadian political party founders
Morgan Stanley people
People from Sorel-Tracy
21st-century Canadian politicians